Hedyleptopsis is a genus of moths of the family Crambidae. It contains only one species, Hedyleptopsis flava, which is found in Indonesia (Sulawesi).

References

Spilomelinae
Taxa named by Eugene G. Munroe
Crambidae genera
Monotypic moth genera